Judge Frank Cox House is a historic home located at Morgantown, Monongalia County, West Virginia. It was designed by Morgantown architect Elmer F. Jacobs and built in 1898. It is a -story Queen Anne style brick dwelling. It features a three-story tower, ornate wood porches, stained glass windows and elaborate interior woodwork.  It was the home of Judge Frank Cox, a prominent lawyer who served as prosecuting attorney and Judge on the Supreme Court of Appeals of West Virginia.

It was listed on the National Register of Historic Places in 1984.

References

Houses completed in 1898
Houses in Morgantown, West Virginia
Houses on the National Register of Historic Places in West Virginia
National Register of Historic Places in Monongalia County, West Virginia
Queen Anne architecture in West Virginia